Pacific High School is an alternative high school in the Sitka School District located in Sitka, Alaska. It serves as an educational alternative to Sitka High School. It is based on the Expeditionary Learning Schools Outward Bound (ELOB) curriculum.

See also
 List of high schools in Alaska

References

External links
 Official page 

Public high schools in Alaska
Alternative schools in the United States
Schools in Sitka, Alaska